Cyanophrys goodsoni, known generally as the Goodson's greenstreak or Goodson's hairstreak, is a species of hairstreak in the butterfly family Lycaenidae. It is found in North America.

The MONA or Hodges number for Cyanophrys goodsoni is 4309.

References

Further reading

 

Cyanophrys
Articles created by Qbugbot
Butterflies described in 1946